The Grosvenor Picture Palace, now known as the Footage, is a former cinema and current pub at the corner of Grosvenor Street and Oxford Road in Chorlton-on-Medlock, Manchester, United Kingdom. Built in 1913–15, it was the largest cinema outside London in its day. It is now a Stonegate pub.

History 
The Grosvenor Picture Palace was designed in 1913 by Percy Hothersall (who later designed Manchester's first supercinema, The Piccadilly, off Piccadilly Gardens in 1922). It is located at the corner of Grosvenor Street and Oxford Road in Chorlton-on-Medlock.

The cinema opened on 19 May 1915, featuring Blanche Forsythe in Jane Shore; it was described at the time as "Roman-Corinthian of the later Renaissance influence". It dates from the period when the first permanent cinemas were being built, with the distinctive design acting as "ostentatious advertising". The cinema had a capacity of just under 1000 people, making it the largest cinema outside London in its day. A billiard hall was installed in the basement in the 1930s.

It was operated by the H.D. Moorehouse chain, before being acquired by Star Cinema Group in the early 1960s, who used the building both for cinema and bingo. It showed features such as Steve Reeves in Hercules Unchained. It was never a commercial success due to its distance from Manchester's city centre. The last films shown were The Passionate Demons and Attack of the Crab Monsters on 18 May 1968, after which the building was used exclusively for bingo. It was later used as a Riley's Snooker Club for several years; it was then boarded up for several years.

In 1990, the building became a Firkin Brewery pub called the Flea and Firkin, described in the Rough Guide as a "predominantly student-filled beer-hall-style pub with brewery on site." The public house was renamed to the Footage and Firkin before the site was sold and became a Scream pub called the Footage. It was refurbished by owners Stonegate Pub Company at a cost of £360,000, and was relaunched on 13 September 2014 with a capacity of 620 people.

Architecture

The two-storey building is rectangular, and is on a corner site with a 3-bay chamfered entrance corner with a pavilion on top. Its facade features green and cream faience and terracotta tiles, and it has 4 bays facing Gosvenor street and 6 bays facing Oxford road. The centre of the Oxford road facade is marked with a raised torch in white terracotta. It has a small attic and a slate roof. It originally had a canopy, which was later removed.

Much of the original interior, including plasterwork, the balcony and the vaulted ceiling, is still present in the building. The inside balcony originally had multi-coloured inlaid panels. 

The building was listed by English Heritage as a Grade II listed building on 3 October 1974.

See also

Listed buildings in Manchester-M1

References 

Theatres completed in 1913
Former cinemas in Manchester
History of Manchester
Grade II listed pubs in Greater Manchester
Pubs in Manchester
Grade II listed buildings in Manchester
1913 establishments in England